Kasagi may refer to:

 Japanese aircraft carrier Kasagi: see Unryū class aircraft carrier
 Japanese cruiser Kasagi
 Kasagi Dam
 Kasagi Station
 Kasagi class cruiser
 Kasagi, Kyoto
 Siege of Kasagi

People with the surname
 Nozomu Kasagi (born 1974), film director
, Japanese rower
 Shizuko Kasagi (1914–1985), singer and actress

Japanese-language surnames